Yooper may refer to:

 Yoopers, people from the Upper Peninsula of Michigan (the "UP")
 Yooper dialect: The dialect of English speech used by the inhabitants of the Upper Peninsula
 Da Yoopers: A comedy–musical group from the area of the Upper Peninsula

American regional nicknames